American country music singer Glen Campbell released fifteen video albums and was featured in twenty-one music videos in his lifetime. His first two music videos, "By the Time I Get to Phoenix" and "Wichita Lineman", were directed by Gene Weed in 1967 and 1968 respectively. Campbell released his final music video, "I'm Not Gonna Miss You", in 2014 to coincide with the release of the documentary Glen Campbell: I'll Be Me.

Music videos

Video albums
Below are listed the original videos and DVDs that have been released by Glen Campbell.

Other video album appearances
Below are listed videos and DVDs by other/various artists on which Glen Campbell is (one of) the main performer(s) on one or several songs.

Detail information per original release

An Evening with Glen Campbell and the Royal Philharmonic

An Evening with Glen Campbell and the Royal Philharmonic was recorded at The Royal Festival Hall in London on April 2, 1977, by BBC television. The video was released in 1985.

Track listing

 "Stars/Rhinestone Cowboy (song)" (Janis Ian/Larry Weiss)
 "Dreams of the Everyday Housewife" (Chris Gantry)
 "Where's The Playground Suzie" (Jimmy Webb)
 "If You Go Away" (Rod McKuen/Jacques Brel)
 "Wichita Lineman" (Jimmy Webb)
 Medley:" (Brian Wilson/Mike Love/Chuck Berry)
 "Good Vibrations"
 "Help Me Rhonda"
 "Surfer Girl"
 "Surfin' U.S.A."
 "Turn Around, Look at Me" (Jerry Capehart/Glen Campbell)
 "Try A Little Kindness" (Curt Sapaugh/Bobby Austin)
 "Didn't We" (Jimmy Webb) (vocal - Jimmy Webb)
 "Soliloquy From Carousel" (Richard Rodgers/Oscar Hammerstein)
 "That's When The Music Takes Me" (Neil Sedaka)
 "Streets Of London" (Ralph McTell)
 "Classical Gas" (Mason Williams)
 "William Tell Overture" (G. Rossini/arr. by Glen Campbell/Dennis McCarthy)
 "Southern Nights" (Allen Toussaint)
 "God Only Knows" (Brian Wilson/Asher)
 "By The Time I Get To Phoenix" (Jimmy Webb)
 "Galveston" (Jimmy Webb)
 "This Is Sarah's Song" (Jimmy Webb)
 "MacArthur Park" (Jimmy Webb)
 "Amazing Grace" (John Newton)

Personnel
Glen Campbell - vocals, acoustic guitar, electric guitar, bagpipes
George Green - drums
Carl Jackson - acoustic guitar, electric guitar, banjo
T.J. Kuenster - piano
Bill McCubbin - bass guitar
Fred Tackett - acoustic guitar
Background vocals - Billie Barnum, Ann White, Stephanie Spruill
The Royal Philharmonic Orchestra
Conducted by Allen Aynsworth and Jimmy Webb

Production
Package design - Prism Entertainment Corp.

Glen Campbell Live

Glen Campbell Live was taped during a 1981 concert in Dublin. The double album Glen Campbell Live has a similar set-list, but was not recorded at the same event.

Track listing

 "Rhinestone Cowboy" (Larry Weiss)
 "Gentle On My Mind" (John Hartford)
 "Medley"
 "Wichita Lineman" (Jimmy Webb)
 "Galveston" (Jimmy Webb)
 "Country Boy (You Got Your Feet In LA)" (Dennis Lambert/Brian Potter)
 "By The Time I Get To Phoenix" (Jimmy Webb)
 "Heartache #3" (Steve Hardin)
 "Please Come To Boston (Dave Loggins)
 "Trials And Tribulations" (Micheal Smotherman)
 "Foggy Mountain Breakdown" (Earl Scruggs)
 "Milk Cow Blues" (Arnold)
 "I'm So Lonesome I Could Cry" (Hank Williams)
 "Southern Nights (song)" (Allen Toussaint)
 "Amazing Grace" (John Newton)
 "Try A Little Kindness" (Sapaugh/Austin)
 "Mull Of Kintyre" (Paul McCartney/Denny Laine)

Personnel
Glen Campbell - vocals, acoustic guitar, electric guitar, bagpipes
Kim Darrigan - bass guitar
Craig Fall - acoustic guitar, electric guitar, keyboards
Steve Hardin - vocals, keyboards, harmonica
Carl Jackson - vocals, acoustic guitar, electric guitar, fiddle, banjo
T.J. Kuenster - vocals, piano
Steve Turner - drums

Production
Executive producer - Jeffrey Kruger
Production assistant - Patricia Swan
Director - Anne McCabe
Technical supervisor - Jerry Hayes
Cameras - Michael Tormey
Sound - Peter Fletcher
Electrical supervision - Liam McDonough
Lighting - Tommy Mulligan
Floor manager - Ronnie Patterson
Unit manager - John Dunne
Make up - Marese Smyth
A Wienerworld production

The Glen Campbell Goodtime Hour with Special Guest Stars: John Wayne, Tim Conway, Carol Burnett, Three Dog Night

The Glen Campbell Goodtime Hour with Special Guest Stars: John Wayne, Tim Conway, Carol Burnett, Three Dog Night contains an episode of The Glen Campbell Goodtime Hour. This video was released in 1990 as part of The Glen Campbell Video Collection. This collection also included The Glen Campbell Music Show with Special Guest Star: Roger Miller and The Glen Campbell Music Show with Special Guest Star: Willie Nelson.

Song selections
 "Sooner or Later" (Gary Zekley, Mitchell Bottler, Adenyi Jacob Paris, Ekundayo Paris, Ted McNamara)
 "Joy to the World" (Hoyt Axton) (performed by Three Dog Night and Glen Campbell)
 "(They Long to Be) Close to You" (Burt Bacharach, Hal David)
 "An Old Fashioned Love Song" (Paul Williams) (performed by Three Dog Night)
 "Put Your Hand in the Hand" (Gene MacLellan) (performed by the Mike Curb Congregation)
 "Take Me Home, Country Roads" (Bill Danoff, Taffy Nivert, John Denver) (performed by Jerry Reed and Glen Campbell)
 "Ko-Ko Joe" (Jerry Reed) (performed by Jerry Reed)
 "He Ain't Heavy, He's My Brother" (Bob Russell, Bobby Scott)

Personnel
Glen Campbell - vocals, acoustic guitar, electric guitar
Jerry Reed - vocals, acoustic guitar
Larry McNeely - banjo, acoustic guitar
Mike Curb Congregation

Production
Executive producer - Neck Sevano
Director - Jack Shea
Writers - Coslough Johnson, Marty Leshner, Bob Arnott, John Bradford, Sandy Krinski, Frank Shaw, Ray Jessel, Rich Eustis, Al Rogers
Music conductor - Marty Paich
Production Consultant - Jerry McPhie
Cover art - Marlene Bergman
Recorded at CBS Television City, Hollywood, CA, September 2, 1971
Family Of Stars Video, distributed by Paul Brownstein Productions
Copyright 1971 Glenco Productions, Inc.

The Glen Campbell Music Show with Special Guest Star: Roger Miller
The Glen Campbell Music Show with Special Guest Star: Roger Miller is an episode of the 30 minute syndicated television show The Glen Campbell Music Show which ran between 1982 and 1983. This video was released in 1990 as part of The Glen Campbell Video Collection. This collection also included The Glen Campbell Music Show with Special Guest Star: Willie Nelson and The Glen Campbell Goodtime Hour with Special Guest Stars: John Wayne, Tim Conway, Carol Burnett, Three Dog Night.

Track listing
 "Southern Nights" (Allen Toussaint)
 "Goin' Back To Alabam " (Copas)
 "By The Time I Get To Phoenix" (Jimmy Webb)
 "It's Your World" (Steve Hardin)
 "King Of The Road" (Roger Miller) (vocal - Roger Miller)
 "Medley:" (vocals - Roger Miller and Glen Campbell)
 In The Summertime" (Roger Miller)
 "Dang Me" (Roger Miller)
 "England Swings" (Roger Miller)

Personnel
Glen Campbell - acoustic guitar, electric guitar
Kim Darrigan - bass guitar, bass fiddle
Craig Fall - acoustic guitar, electric guitar, keyboards
Steve Hardin - vocals, harmonica, keyboards
Carl Jackson - vocals, banjo, acoustic guitar,  electric guitar, fiddle, mandolin
T. J. Kuenster - vocals, acoustic piano, electric piano
Steve Turner - drums

Production
Executive producer - Pierre Cossette
Producer/director - Bob Henry
Cover art design - Marlene Bergman
Music clearance - Suzy Vaughn Associates
A production of Gaylord Entertainment Television and The Glen Campbell Company, 1982

Glen Campbell Music Show with Special Guest Star: Willie Nelson

The Glen Campbell Music Show with Special Guest Star: Willie Nelson is an episode of the 30 minute syndicated television show The Glen Campbell Music Show which ran between 1982 and 1983. This video was released in 1990 as part of The Glen Campbell Video Collection. This collection also included The Glen Campbell Music Show with Special Guest Star: Roger Miller and The Glen Campbell Goodtime Hour with Special Guest Stars: John Wayne, Tim Conway, Carol Burnett, Three Dog Night.

Track listing
 "On The Road Again" (Willie Nelson) (vocals Glen Campbell and Willie  Nelson)
 "Always On My Mind" (Willie Nelson) (vocal Willie Nelson)
 "Crazy" (Nelson)
 "Just To Satisfy You" (Jennings/Bowman) (vocals Glen Campbell and Willie Nelson)
 "Mama Don't Let Your Babies Grow Up To Be Cowboys" (Willie Nelson) (vocals Glen Campbell and Willie Nelson)
 "Uncloudy Day" (Willie Nelson)
 "Old Friends" (Roger Miller) (vocals Glen Campbell, Willie Nelson, Roger Miller)

Personnel
Glen Campbell - acoustic guitar, electric guitar
Kim Darrigan - bass guitar, bass fiddle
Craig Fall - acoustic guitar, electric guitar, keyboards
Steve Hardin - vocals, harmonica, keyboards
Carl Jackson - vocals, banjo, acoustic guitar,  electric guitar, fiddle, mandolin
T. J. Kuenster - vocals, acoustic piano, electric piano
Steve Turner - drums

Production
Executive producer - Pierre Cossette
Producer/director - Bob Henry
Cover art design - Marlene Bergman
Music clearance - Suzy Vaughn Associates
A production of Gaylord Entertainment Television and The Glen Campbell Company, 1982

Live at the Dome

Live at the Dome contains a live concert by Glen Campbell and the Jeff Dayton Band. The concert was taped at The Dome in Doncaster, England in 1990. In 2011 for the first time the concert was released in CD format, as part of the boxset Through the Years Live - Ultimate Collection.

Track listing
 "Rhinestone Cowboy" (Larry Weiss)
 "Galveston" (Jimmy Webb)
 "By The Time I Get To Phoenix" (Jimmy Webb)
 "Try A Little Kindness" (Curt Sapaugh/Bobby Austin)
 "Wichita Lineman" (Jimmy Webb)
 "She's Gone, Gone, Gone" (Harlan Howard)
 "Walkin' In The Sun" (Jeff Barry)
 "On A Good Night" (Jim Weatherly/Keith Stegall)
 "True Grit" (Don Black/Elmer Bernstein)
 "The Hand That Rocks The Cradle" (Ted Harris)
 "I Remember You" (Johnny Mercer/Victor Schertzinger)
 "I'm a One-Woman Man" (Tillman Franks/Johnny Horton)
 "Orange Blossom Special " (E. Rouse)
 "Highwayman" (Jimmy Webb)
 "The Streets Of London" (Ralph McTell)
 "A Thing Called Love" (Jerry R. Hubbard)
 "Southern Nights" (Allen Toussaint)
 "William Tell Overture" (G. Rossini)
 "Medley" (Brian Wilson/Mike Love/Chuck Berry)
 "Good Vibrations"
 "California Girls"
 "Fun Fun Fun"
 "I Get Around"
 "Surfin' USA"
 "Amazing Grace" (John Newton)
 "Mull Of Kintyre" (Paul McCartney/Denny Laine)
 "Gentle On my Mind" (John Hartford)

Personnel
Glen Campbell - vocals, acoustic guitar, electric guitar, bagpipes
Tom Benton - backing vocals, drums
John Berafatto - piano
Arvel Byrd - fiddle
Jeff Dayton - backing vocal, acoustic guitar, electric guitar
Bob Henke - backing vocals, bass guitar
Kenny Skaggs - backing vocals, steel guitar, mandolin, tambourine

Branson Video Classics Glen Campbell Goodtime Show

A 1994 live performance by Glen Campbell recorded in The Glen Campbell Goodtime Theater in Branson, Mo.

Track listing
 "Gentle On My Mind" (John Hartford)
 "By The Time I Get To Phoenix" (Jimmy Webb)
 "Kentucky Means Paradise" (Merle Travis)
 "Wichita Lineman" (Jimmy Webb)
 "Galveston" (Jimmy Webb)
 "Mansion In Branson" (Paul Overstreet)
 "Why Haven't I Heard From You" (Knox/T.W. Cale) (vocal Debby Campbell)
 "The Boy In Me" (Kevin Stokes/Geoff Thurman)
 "Try A Little Kindness" (Kurt Sapaugh/Bobby Austin) (duet with Campbell Sisters)
 "Classical Gas" (Mason Williams)
 "Cowboy Jubilee " (Gene Autry) (T.J. Kuenster/Goodtime Band/Matthew Dickins Dancers)
 "Rhinestone Cowboy" (Larry Weiss)
 "Medley":
 "It's Only Make Believe" (Jack Nance/Conway Twitty)
 "Turn Around Look At Me" (Jerry Capehart/Glen Campbell)
 "Where's The Playground  Suzie" (Jimmy Webb)
 "Hey Little One " (Dorsey Burnette/Barry De Vorzon)
 "Country Boy (You Got Your Feet In L.A.) (Dennis Lambert/Brian Potter)
 "Mary In The Morning" (J. Cymbal/M. Lendell)
 "Dreams Of The Everyday  Housewife" (Chris Gantry)
 "Sunflower" (Neil Diamond)
 "Let It Be Me" (M. Curtis/G. Becaud) (duet with Debby Campbell)
 "No More Night" (Walt Harrah)
 "Southern Nights" (Allen Toussaint)

Personnel
Glen Campbell - vocals, acoustic guitar, electric guitar
Debby Campbell - vocals
Gary Brusesse - drums, vocals
Jeff Dayton - electric guitar, acoustic guitar, vocals
Noel Kirkland - fiddle, banjo, keyboards
T.J. Kuenster - musical director, piano, vocals
Kenny Skaggs - acoustic guitar, mandolin, dobro, steel guitar, backing vocals
Russ Skaggs - bass guitar, backing vocals

Production
Video-taped at The Glen Campbell Goodtime Theatre, Branson, MO
Produced and distributed by Ventura Entertainment Group, LTD, 1994

Christmas with Glen Campbell

Christmas with Glen Campbell contains various Christmas songs and skits from The Glen Campbell Goodtime Hour prefaced by an introduction by Glen Campbell himself which was filmed backstage at the Glen Campbell Goodtime Theater in 1996. This video was only sold at this theater and by mail order from there.

Track listing

 "The Christmas Song"
 "Christmas Wishes" (Anne Murray)
 "A Winter Wonderland" (with Anne Murray)
 "Jingle Bells" (with Chorus)
 "Bless This House" (with Chorus)
 "Little Toy Trains"
 "There's No Place Like Home"
 
Includes various comedy skits featuring George Gobel, Shecky Greene, Larry McNeely, Mel Tillis and Dom DeLuise.

Production
Design - N. Comerford
Artist Photo - John Russell
1996 Delta Music, Inc.
Licensed from Glen Campbell Enterprises

Glen Campbell in Concert

Glen Campbell in Concert captures a concert by Glen Campbell with the South Dakota Symphony Orchestra, performed in The Great Hall of The Washington Pavilion of Arts and Sciences, Sioux Falls, South Dakota on January 10 and 11, 2001.
The concert was initially recorded for the PBS television special "Glen Campbell - In Concert", which aired in March 2001. PBS offered a video of the concert for fundraising purposes, including two bonus tracks ("Don't Pull Your Love on Me/Then You Can Tell Me Goodbye" and "MacArthur Park"). In the same year, the CD release followed, including three more bonus tracks ("Time in a Bottle", "Let It Be Me" and "Try a Little Kindness") which was only available as concert merchandise. In March 2002, a generally available DVD of the concert was released including all 22 tracks plus some extra features.

Track listing

 "Wichita Lineman" (Jimmy Webb)
 "Gentle On My Mind" (John Hartford)
 "Dreams Of The Everyday Housewife" (Chris Gantry)
 "Highwayman" (Jimmy Webb)
 "By The Time I Get To Phoenix" (Jimmy Webb)
 "Classical Gas" (Mason Williams)
 "It's Only Make Believe" (Conway Twitty/Jack Nance)
 "Little Green Apples" (Russell)
 "Southern Nights" (Allen Toussaint)
 "Rhinestone Cowboy" (Larry Weiss)
 "Galveston" (Jimmy Webb)
 "Since I Fell For You" (Johnson)
 "The Moon Is A Harsh Mistress" (Jimmy Webb)
 "The William Tell Overture" (Rossini)
 "True Grit" (Don Black/Elmer Bernstein)
 "Still Within The Sound Of My Voice" (Jimmy Webb)
 "Amazing Grace" (John Newton)

Bonus tracks (DVD):
 "Don't Pull Your Love/Then You Can Tell Me Goodbye" (Dennis Lambert/Brian Potter/John D. Loudermilk)
 "MacArthur Park" (Jimmy Webb)
 "Let It Be Me" (Becaud/Kurtz/Leroyer)
 "Time In A Bottle" (Jim Croce)
 "Try A Little Kindness" (Sapaugh/Austin)
 Behind the Scenes
 Biography
 Discography
 Photo Gallery

Personnel
Glen Campbell - vocals, acoustic guitar, electric guitar, bagpipes
Debby Campbell - vocals
Garry Bruzzese- drums, harmony vocals
Jeff Dayton - acoustic guitar, electric guitar, harmony vocals
T. J. Kuenster - conductor, piano
Ken Skaggs - Acoustic Guitar, mandolin, backing vocals
Russ Skaggs - bass guitar, backing vocals
The South Dakota Symphony Orchestra

Production
Executive producers - Martin Fischer/Glen Campbell
Director - Stanley Dorfman
Program content/artwork - Glen Campbell Enterprises,LTD
DVD package design - MMI Image Entertainment, INC, Chatsworth, CA
Recorded for PBS at the Washington Pavilion of Arts and Sciences, Sioux Falls, SD

Good Times Again

Good Times Again contains a selection of solo performances and duets by Glen Campbell taken from The Glen Campbell Goodtime Hour, a weekly CBS television show that ran from January 1969 until June 1972.

Track listing
 "Wichita Lineman" (Jimmy Webb)
 "Comedy Skit" (with The Smothers Brothers)
 "For Once in My Life" (Miller/Murden)
 "Carolina in My Mind" (James Taylor) (with Linda Ronstadt)
 "Cryin' Time" (with Ray Charles)
 "Let It Be Me" (Becaud/Curtis/Delanoe) (with Bobbie Gentry)
 "Galveston" (Jimmy Webb)
 "Louisiana Man" (with Ricky Nelson)
 "All I Really Want To Do" (Bob Dylan) (with Cher)
 "Don't Think Twice, It's All Right" (Bob Dylan) (with Anne Murray)
 "King of the Road" (Roger Miller) (with Roger Miller)
 "By the Time I Get to Phoenix" (Jimmy Webb)
 "True Grit" (Don Black/Elmer Bernstein)
 "Raindrops Keep Falling On My Head" (Burt Bacharach/Hal David) (with B.J. Thomas)
 "Folsom Prison Blues" (John R. Cash) (with Johnny Cash)
 "Hello Walls" (Willie Nelson) (with Willie Nelson)
 "Gentle On My Mind" (John Hartford) (with John Hartford)

Production
Cover photo - Getty Images
High Five Entertainment distributed through Time/Life Video
Program content copyright 2007 Glen Campbell Enterprises, Ltd.
Recent introductions of segments recorded by Glen Campbell at the Andy Williams Moon River Theatre, Branson, MO, 2006

Best of The Glen Campbell Music Show

Best of The Glen Campbell Music Show contains a selection of performances by Glen Campbell, band and orchestra taken from  BBC television shows Glen Campbell From The Talk of the Town (1972) and The Glen Campbell Music Show (1975). Bonus features are a 1975 Glen Campbell Music Show performance with songwriter Jimmy Webb on piano and six songs from the 1981 (not 1978 as is mentioned on the back cover of the DVD) concert in Dublin.

Track listing

 "Dream Baby (How Long Must I Dream) (Cindy Walker)
 "By The Time I Get To Phoenix" (Jimmy Webb)
 "Mary In The Morning" (Michael Lendell/Johnny Cymbal)
 "Try A Little Kindness" (Kurt Sapaugh/Bobby Austin)
 "Gentle On My Mind" (John Hartford)
 "Ocean In His Eyes" (Jimmy Webb)
 "Time In A Bottle" (Jim Croce)
 "Dreams Of The Everyday Housewife" (Chris Gantry)
 "Help Me Make It Through The Night" (Kris Kristofferson)
 "Wichita Lineman" (Jimmy Webb)
 "Galveston" (Jimmy Webb)
 "Country Boy" (Ricky Skaggs)
 "Oklahoma Sunday Morning" (Tony Macauley/H. Hazelwood)
 "It's A Sin When You Love Somebody" (Jimmy Webb)
 "The Moon's A Harsh Mistress" (Jimmy Webb)
 "Ain't No Sunshine" (Bill Withers) (instrumental)
 "Oh Happy Day" (Edwin R. Hawkins)

Bonus Feature 1
Glen Campbell with Jimmy Webb 1975

 "Medley:"
 "By The Time I Get To Phoenix" (Jimmy Webb)
 "Wichita Lineman" (Jimmy Webb)
 "Galveston" (Jimmy Webb)
 "Honey Come Back" (Jimmy Webb)
 "Didn't We" (Jimmy Webb)
 MacArthur Park" (Jimmy Webb)

Bonus Feature 2
Glen Campbell Live 1981

 "Rhinestone Cowboy" (Larry Weiss)
 "Trials And Tribulations" (Michael Smotherman)
 "Southern Nights" (Allen Toussaint)
 "Heartache #3" (Steve Hardin)
 "I'm So Lonesome I Could Cry" (Hank Williams)
 "Milk Cow Blues" (Arnold)

Personnel
Glen Campbell - vocals, acoustic guitar, electric guitar
Bob Felts - drums
Billy Graham - bass guitar, harmony vocals
Carl Jackson - acoustic guitar, electric guitar, banjo, harmony  vocals
Dennis McCarthy - musical director, keyboards
Orchestra
 
Glen Campbell with Jimmy Webb 1975
Glen Campbell - vocals, electric guitar
Jimmy Webb - piano
Orchestra
 
Glen Campbell Live 1981
Glen Campbell - vocals, electric guitar, acoustic guitar
Kim Darrigan - bass guitar
Craig Fall - acoustic guitar, electric guitar, keyboards
Steve Hardin - vocals, organ, harmonica
Carl Jackson - vocals, electric guitar, fiddle, mandolin, banjo
T.J. Kuenster - vocals, piano
Steve Turner - drums

Production
Manufactured in the EU
Marketed and distributed by Cherry Red Records, ltd
An RPM Productions release under license from TKO Licensing ltd,  2006

Glen Campbell and Friends

Glen Campbell and Friends contains all six episodes of the 1975 BBC television show "The Glen Campbell Music Show". Each episode featured one special guest star and ran for 30 to 45 minutes. The television series began their screening on Sunday, April 20, 1975, on BBC2.

The shows were taped for worldwide distribution. In 1976, five shows ran on Global TV in Canada and in 1980, they were made available as 50 minute specials for US cable television, under the title of "Glen Campbell and Friends". In 2007 all six episodes were released on DVD.

Track listing

Disk 1:
With Special Guest Star David Gates
 "Once In A Lifetime"
 "Try A Little Kindness" (Curt Sapaugh/Bobby Austin)
 "William Tell Overture" (Rossini)
 "Everything I Own" (David Gates) - David Gates
 "Oh Happy Day" (Edwin Hawkins)
 "Fox Fire" (Carl Jackson)
 "Part Time Love" (David Gates) - David Gates
 "Medley:" - duet with David Gates
 "Make It With You" (David Gates)
 "Baby I'm A Want You" (David Gates)
 "Never Let Her Go" (David Gates)
 "If" (David Gates)

With Special Guest Star Anne Murray
 "More/Somewhere" (R. Ortolani/N.Oliviero/Leonard Bernstein/Stephen Sondheim)
 "The Most Beautiful Girl In The World" (Billy Sherrill/Norris Wilson/Rory Michael Bourke)
 "Teddy Bear" (Kal Mann/Bernie Lowe)
 "Annie's Song" (John Denver)
 "Dream Lover" (Bobby Darin) - Anne Murray
 "Highly Prized Possession" (A. Palmer) - Anne Murray
 "Classical Gas" (Mason Williams)
 "Time In A Bottle" (Jim Croce)
 "Orange Blossom Special" (E. Rouse)
 "You Won't See Me" (John Lennon/Paul McCartney) - Anne Murray
 "Say A Little Prayer/By The Time I Get To Phoenix" (Burt Bacharach/Hal David/Jimmy Webb) - duet with Anne Murray
 "Soliloquy From 'Carousel'" (Richard Rodgers/Oscar Hammerstein)

Disk 2:
With Special Guest Stars Seals & Crofts
 "Where Or When"
 "Gentle On My Mind" (John Hartford)
 "It's A Sin" (Jimmy Webb)
 "I'll Play For You" (Seals/Crofts) - Seals & Crofts
 "You Might As Well Smile" (Jimmy Webb)
 "Moments To Remember"
 "The Way We Were"/"Try To Remember" (Harvey Schmidt/Tom Jones/Marvin Hamlisch/Alan Bergman/Marilyn Bergman)
 "Tequila" (Daniel Flores) - Glen Campbell, Seals & Crofts
 "Summer Breeze" (Seals/Crofts) - Glen Campbell, Seals & Crofts
 "Fiddle Hoe Down" - Glen Campbell, Seals & Crofts
 "I Will Never Pass This Way Again" (Ronnie Gaylord)
 "American Trilogy" (Mickey Newbury)

 With Special Guest Star Jimmy Webb
 "Up And Away" (Jimmy Webb)
 "Ocean In His Eyes" (Jimmy Webb)
 "Streets Of London" (Ralph McTell)
 "Foggy Mountain Breakdown" (with Carl Jackson) (Earl Scruggs)
 "All I Know" (Jimmy Webb) - Jimmy Webb
 "Medley":
 "By The Time I Get To Phoenix" (Jimmy Webb)
 "Wichita Lineman" (Jimmy Webb)
 "Galveston" (Jimmy Webb)
 "Didn't We" (Jimmy Webb)
 "The Moon's A Harsh Mistress" (Jimmy Webb)
 "Roll Me Easy" (Lowell George)
 "Bonaparte's Retreat" (Pee Wee King)
 "MacArthur Park" (Jimmy Webb)

Disk 3:
 With Special Guest Star Wayne Newton
 "Dream Baby (How Long Must I Dream)" (Cindy Walker)
 "I Honestly Love You" (Peter Allen/Jeff Barry)
 "Fly Me to the Moon" (Bart Howard) - Wayne Newton
 "It Only Takes a Moment" - Wayne Newton
 "Bridge Over Troubled Water" (Paul Simon) - Wayne Newton
 "Ain't No Sunshine" (Bill Withers)
 "Dreams of the Everyday Housewife" (Chris Gantry)
 "Take Me Home Country Roads" (John Denver)
 "Duelling Banjos" (with Carl Jackson) (Arthur "Guitar Boogie" Smith/Don Reno)
 "Country Boy" (Albert Lee)
 "Medley: - duet with Wayne Newton
 "Little Green Apples" (Bobby Russell)
 "Honey" (Bobby Russell)
 "Honey Come Back" (Jimmy Webb)
 "Release Me" (Eddie Miller/Robert Yount/Dub Williams)
 "He Ain't Heavy He's My Brother" (Bob Russell)

 With Special Guest Star Helen Reddy
 "I Believe In Music" (Mac Davis)
 "Galveston" (Jimmy Webb)
 "Mary In The Morning" (Michael Lendell/Johnny Cymbal)
 "The Entertainer" (Scott Joplin)
 "Angie Baby" (Alan O'Day) - Helen Reddy
 "You And Me Against The World" (Paul Williams) - Helen Reddy
 "Give Me Back That Old Familiar Feeling" (Billy Graham)
 "I'm Just A Pushover" (Billy Graham) - Billy Graham
 "Y'all Come" (Arlie Duff)
 "Back Home Again in Indiana" (Ballard MacDonald/James F. Hanley)
 "I Am Woman" (Helen Reddy/Ray Burton) - Helen Reddy
 "Delta Dawn" (Alex Harvey) - duet with Helen Reddy
 "The Impossible Dream" (Mitch Leigh/Joe Darion)

Personnel
Glen Campbell - vocals, acoustic guitar, electric guitar
Bob Felts - drums
Billy Graham - bass guitar, harmony vocals
Carl Jackson - acoustic guitar, electric guitar, banjo, harmony  vocals
Dennis McCarthy - musical director, keyboards
Vocal backings - The Maggie Stredder Singers

Production
Produced by Terry Hughes
Orchestra directed by Richard Holmes
Production assistant - Marcus Plantin
Special musical arrangements - Dennis McCarthy
Make Up - Jackie Fitz-Maurice, Deanne Turner, Pauline Gyertson
Sound - Len Shorey
Lightning - Bill Millar
Design - Lesley Bremness
Distributed by ILC Media
Issued under license from TKO Licensing Limited

Through the Years Live - Ultimate Collection
Through the Years Live - Ultimate Collection is a DVD/CD set released to coincide with the UK leg of the Glen Campbell Goodbye Tour. The CD contains the audiotrack of the previously released video
Live at the Dome. The DVD consists of a selection of performances by Glen Campbell, band and orchestra taken from BBC television shows Glen Campbell From The Talk of the Town (1972) and The Glen Campbell Music Show (1975) and two concerts, previously released as Live at the Dome (1990) and Glen Campbell in Concert (2001). Five previously unreleased performances are included: "If You Go Away" (1972), "The Impossible Dream" (1972), "Try a Little Kindness/Honey Come Back/Gentle on My Mind" (1972), "Where's the Playground Suzie" (1975) and "Proud Mary" (1975).

Track listing
 "By the Time I Get to Phoenix" (Jimmy Webb)
 "If You Go Away" (Jacques Brel/Rod McKuen)
 "Help Me Make It Through the Night" (Kris Kristofferson)
 "Galveston" (Jimmy Webb)
 "Wichita Lineman" (Jimmy Webb)
 "The Impossible Dream" (Darion/Leigh)
 "Gentle on My Mind" (John Hartford)
 "Mary in the Morning" (Cymbal)
 "Try a Little Kindness" (Austin/Sapaugh)
 "Where's the Playground Suzie" (Jimmy Webb)
 "Oh Happy Day" (Rimbault/Doddridge/arr. Hawkins)
 "He Ain't Heavy, He's My Brother (Russell/Scott)
 "Dreams of the Everyday Housewife" (Chris Gantry)
 "Bonaparte's Retreat" (King/Stewart)
 "MacArthur Park (Jimmy Webb)
 "I Will Never Pass This Way Again" (Gaylord)
 "Rhinestone Cowboy" (Larry Weiss)
 "Southern Nights" (Allen Toussaint)
 "True Grit" (Joel Bernstein/Don Black)
 "Mull of Kintyre" (Paul McCartney)
 "Highwayman" (Jimmy Webb)
 "It's Only Make Believe" (Conway Twitty/Jack Nance)
 "Amazing Grace" (John Newton)

Bonus features

Instrumentals
 Duelling Banjos (Smith)
 Ain't No Sunshine (Bill Withers)
 Orange Blossom Special (Rouse)
 Fox Fire (Size)
 The Entertainer (Scott Joplin)
 Foggy Mountain Breakdown (Earl Scruggs)
 William Tell Overture (Rossini)
 Classical Gas (Mason Williams)

Duets and medleys
 Medley with David Gates: 
 Make It with You (David Gates)
 Baby I'm-a Want You (David Gates)
 Never Let Her Go (David Gates)
 Medley with Jimmy Webb: 
 By the Time I Get to Phoenix (Jimmy Webb)
 Wichita Lineman (Jimmy Webb)
 Galveston (Jimmy Webb)
 Honey Come Back (Jimmy Webb)
 Duet with Anne Murray: I Say a Little Prayer/By the Time I Get to Phoenix (Burt Bacharach/Hal David/Jimmy Webb)
 Duet with Helen Reddy: Delta Dawn (Harvey/Collins)
 Medley with Wayne Newton: 
 Little Green Apples (Bobby Russell)
 Honey (Bobby Russell)
 Honey Come Back (Jimmy Webb)
 Please Release Me (Miller/Williams/Young)
 Duet with Seals & Crofts: Summer Breeze (Jimmy Seals/Dash Crofts)
 Medley:
 Try a Little Kindness (Austin/Sapaugh)
 Honey Come Back (Jimmy Webb)
 Gentle on My Mind (John Hartford)
 Medley:
 Good Vibrations (Brian Wilson/Mike Love)
 California Girls (Brian Wilson/Mike Love)
 Fun Fun Fund (Mike Love/Brian Wilson)
 I Get Around (Mike Love/Brian Wilson)
 Surfin' USA (Chuck Berry/Brian Wilson)
 Duet with Debby Campbell: Little Green Apples (Bobby Russell)

Bonus tracks
 Didn't We (Jimmy Webb)
 Streets of London (Ralph McTell)
 An American Trilogy (trad. arr. by Mickey Newbury)
 Time in a Bottle (Jim Croce)
 Proud Mary (John Fogerty)
 Annie's Song (John Denver)

Personnel
Glen Campbell - vocals, acoustic guitar, electric guitar, bagpipes

Production
Executive producers - Jeffrey Kruger and Howard Kruger

Glen Campbell and Jimmy Webb In Session

Glen Campbell American Treasure
Glen Campbell American Treasure is a limited edition box set compilation with three CDs and one DVD released by Surfdog records. The set's DVD features select musical and comedic performances by Campbell and guests on The Glen Campbell Goodtime Hour, broadcast on CBS-TV between 1969 and 1972. This box set is limited to 1,000 copies.

Release
American Treasure was available for pre-order in February 2012, with an anticipated release date in late spring of the same year.  However, production of the box set was subsequently delayed twice, first until late summer / early fall of 2012, due to third-party clearance issues with some of its licensed materials, and again until mid-December, when the box set was ultimately released for distribution.

Track listing

See also
 Glen Campbell discography
 Glen Campbell collaborative discography

References

Videos
Videographies of American artists